Mixed Blessings may refer to:
 Mixed Blessings (novel), a 1993 novel by Danielle Steel
 Mixed Blessings (film), a film based on the novel
 Mixed Blessings (British TV series), a sitcom
 Mixed Blessings (Canadian TV series)
 "Mixed Blessing", an episode of The Golden Girls